S v Williams and Others is a decision of the Constitutional Court of South Africa in which the court ruled that judicial corporal punishment of juveniles is unconstitutional. The decision was taken with respect to five different cases in which six juveniles were convicted by different magistrates and sentenced to receive a "moderate correction" of a number of strokes with a light cane.

The unanimous judgment, handed down on 9 June 1995, found the imposition of corporal punishment to be incompatible with the Interim Constitution of South Africa because it violates the right to human dignity and the protection against cruel, inhuman or degrading punishment.

The case did not deal with judicial corporal punishment of adults, but in argument before the court all parties agreed that it was unconstitutional. In 1997 Parliament passed the Abolition of Corporal Punishment Act, which repealed all laws allowing for judicial corporal punishment.

References

External links
 Text of the judgment

Constitutional Court of South Africa cases
South African criminal case law
1995 in South African law
1995 in case law
Corporal punishment case law
Children's rights